Max Schmalzl (7 July 1850 – 7 January 1930) was a German Redemptorist lay brother who worked as a painter, illustrator, and designer in the style of the Nazarene and the Beuron schools. His intricate woodcuts and illustrations are ubiquitous in Catholic missals and devotional volumes from the late 1800s and early 1900s.

Biography

Born on 7 July 1850 in Falkenstein, Bavaria, Max Schmalzl came from a Catholic family that was both religious and devoted to ecclesiastical art. His older brother, Peter Schmalzl (1835–1874), was a Redemptorist priest who was a painter in his own right, and his nephew Rudolf Schmalzl (1890–1932) was also a well-known church painter. Schmalzl would later occasionally collaborate with his nephew, most notably in the decoration of the pilgrimage church of Halbmeile near Deggendorf (1910).

Schmalzl attended the Königliche Kunstgewerbeschule (Royal School of Applied Arts) in Munich where he was a student of Theodor Spieß (1846–1920). Schmalzl received an education as a decorative painter and was recognized for his talents such that he received a royal scholarship of 200 guilders in September 1871.

After completing his training as an artist, Schmalzl joined the Redemptorist Order at Gars Abbey in Gars am Inn. He entered the novitiate there in November 1871. He never received priestly ordination, but remained a lay brother.

Schmalzl died at the monastery in Gars am Inn on 7 January 1930 at the age of 79.

Legacy and influence

Because of his monastic lifestyle, Schmalzl was able to be entirely devoted to his work. His artistic subjects were exclusively religious, and his style devotional, dogmatically determined, and precisely drafted. The aesthetic of his work was inspired by the Nazarene school, which looked to the early Italian Renaissance as a model in terms of spiritual purity. Beuronese overtones are obvious, however, in his highly geometric compositions and the general monastic spirit with which he approached his work. In the end, however, his artistic style was uniquely his: he developed a particular style very early in his career, and he remained faithful to that style throughout the entire course of his career.

Monika Schwarzenberger-Wurster, in a 2010 doctoral thesis for the University of Regensburg, evaluated Schmalzl's artistic legacy:

Because of his monastic background and the fact that he remained faithful to the Nazarene approach until his death in 1930, Schmalzl has been called "the Last Nazarene." At the height of his fame, he was called "the Bavarian Fra Angelico".

Artistic oeuvre
Due to a long-standing collaboration with the Regensburg publishing house Friedrich Pustet, Schmalzl's work became ubiquitous in Catholic circles. Schmalzl provided the publisher with about 150 illustrations for liturgical works, books for private devotion, and mass-produced religious articles which circulated widely and made his work known throughout the world. In addition to illustrations and painting, Schmalzl also designed sculptures, altars, liturgical instruments and other religious objects, such as reliquaries.

Although many of his illustrations are not signed, Schmalzl did occasionally incorporate the initials "FMS" or "FrMSch" into his work, both of which stand for Frater Max Schmalzl.

Notable works
In addition to his illustration work for Friedrich Pustet, Schmalzl was also responsible for the decoration and furnishing of several churches.

 Decoration of the monastery chapel of the Church of Our Lady of Perpetual Help in Vilsbiburg, Germany (1873–1880)
 Decoration of the private chapel of the Redemptorists at Gars am Inn, Germany (1885)
 Decoration of the parish church of St. Bartholomew in Kraiburg am Inn, Germany (1893–1897)
 Frescoes in Sant'Alfonso all'Esquilino, Rome, Italy (1898)
 Design of the altar and frescoes in the Bavarian Chapel of San Gioacchino ai Prati in Rome, Italy (1904)
 Design of the frescoes, stained glass, liturgical furnishings and other decorations in the Church of Our Lady of Perpetual Help (Klosterkirche Maria Hilf) in Cham, Germany (1902–1909)
 Mosaic via crucis in the Cathedral of the Assumption in Covington, Kentucky (1919)

References

Notes

References

Works cited

1850 births
1930 deaths
People from Cham (district)
German engravers
19th-century German painters
19th-century German male artists
20th-century German painters
20th-century German male artists
German Roman Catholics
Redemptorists